Ruxton Hayward was a British eccentric.  In the early 1950s, as a scoutmaster in London, he attempted to recruit acts for a stage show. He approached Michael Bentine, and then, at Bentine's recommendation, Peter Sellers.  Sellers was so taken with Hayward's appearance—the man being tall with a bushy red beard, and wearing a Boy Scout uniform with short trousers—that he used an imitation of Hayward's high-pitched voice for the character Bluebottle in The Goon Show. The character became a popular regular in the series, and was often greeted by applause and cheers from the studio audience.

Hayward lived on, unaware of his fame until the events above were described by Peter Sellers on television in 1972. After this Hayward attempted a stage career, developing characters he called "Bearded Schoolboy", "Woolly Wolfcub", and "Happy Sandboy".  He also made appearances at meetings of the Goon Show Preservation Society.  He was an active member of the actors union Equity, subsection Variety.  According to an article in The Guardian, he was elected as a union representative at least once.

In 1999 Hayward pleaded guilty to making an indecent image of a child under 16. 

The Goon Show Preservation Society website reported Ruxton's death in Charing Cross Hospital, London on 22 September 2011.

References

The Goon Show
Male actors from London
People from Hammersmith
1930 births
2011 deaths